The 1987–88 season was Colchester United's 46th season in their history and seventh consecutive season in fourth tier of English football, the Fourth Division. Alongside competing in the Fourth Division, the club also participated in the FA Cup, the League Cup and the Associate Members' Cup.

After a promising start to the season under Mike Walker, a disagreement between him and chairman Jonathan Crisp saw Walker leave Layer Road and in his place Roger Brown was recruited. From joint top of the table, Brown's side won just five games in the second half of the season to finish the season ninth.

Colchester reached the third round of the FA Cup, beating Tamworth and Hereford United before elimination by Plymouth Argyle. In the Associate Members' Cup, Colchester reached the southern section quarter-final, where they were defeated 3–2 by Notts County. The club were less successful in the League Cup as they fell to a 5–1 aggregate defeat to Fulham.

Season overview
Keen to improve on last years play-off disappointment, manager Mike Walker recruited former U's boss Allan Hunter as his coach.

Club regulars Tony Adcock and Alec Chamberlain both left the club during the summer of 1987 in big money moves. Adcock signed for Second Division Manchester City for £75,000, while Chamberlain joined First Division Everton for £80,000 as understudy to Neville Southall. Walker then broke the club transfer record to bring in striker Dale Tempest for £40,000.

Chairman Jonathan Crisp announced that, in light of worsening football hooliganism across the nation, a 100% members-only scheme would be in place for the new season, banning away fans from attending matches at Layer Road. To deflect any negative attention, he also leaked details regarding a new stadium at Turner Rise while introducing developers Norcross Estates as shirt sponsors.

Owing to the new scheme, only 1,300 members attended the first fixture of the season, a drop of 1,400 on last seasons average attendance. A new record low crowd was set on 29 September when just 1,140 watched the 2–1 win over Swansea City.

Having rebuilt his side and winning seven out of eight games, Walker was abruptly sacked by Crisp while the U's were joint-top of the Fourth Division table. Crisp had claimed that Walker had resigned, but alleged personal differences were said to have been the cause. Bizarrely, Walker won the Manager of the Month award after he had been sacked.

Incoming as new manage was Roger Brown, formerly manager of Poole Town while working as a factory manager. He had been recommended to Crisp by his advisors, but he took the U's from top spot on New Year's Day to ninth at the end of the season after earning just five wins from January until May.

Crisp had to concede his membership scheme in November after hundreds of Wolverhampton Wanderers fans registered as members to boost the Layer Road attendance to an unusually high figure of 2,413 for that season. Crisp claimed the scheme had only been an experiment, and this was reflected in the season average of just 1,776.

Following on from his Turner Rise leaked plans, Crisp considered selling Layer Road and ground sharing Portman Road with Ipswich Town while the new stadium was built. His decision however was swayed by a group of former club directors. By selling up, Crisp would have recouped his outlay, but when the stadium plans were delayed over land ownership, Colchester United would have been left completely homeless with no assets except for the players.

Players

Transfers

In

 Total spending:  ~ £92,500

Out

 Total incoming:  ~ £165,000

Loans in

Loans out

Match details

Fourth Division

Results round by round

League table

Matches

League Cup

Associate Members' Cup

FA Cup

Squad statistics

Appearances and goals

|-
!colspan="14"|Players who appeared for Colchester who left during the season

|}

Goalscorers

Disciplinary record

Clean sheets
Number of games goalkeepers kept a clean sheet.

Player debuts
Players making their first-team Colchester United debut in a fully competitive match.

See also
List of Colchester United F.C. seasons

References

General
Books

Websites

Specific

1987-88
English football clubs 1987–88 season
1987–88 Football League Fourth Division by team